Gurijala Nayakas were a Kamma clan who ruled Ramagiri Fort as capital during 14th and 15th centuries. Most famous of this clan was king Gurijala Muppa Bhupathi. He patronised famous poet Madiki Singana.

References

Indian families
States and territories established in 1325
States and territories disestablished in the 1430s
14th century in India
15th century in India